Mount Back is a peak,  high, located  south of Doris Bay, South Georgia. It was named by the UK Antarctic Place-Names Committee for Squadron Leader Anthony H. Back, Royal Air Force, assistant surveyor with the British Combined Services Expedition of 1964–65, who assisted in the survey of this peak.

References

Mountains and hills of South Georgia